Hellboy Junior is a one-shot and two-issue comic book mini-series published by American company Dark Horse Comics. Written and drawn by Bill Wray, Mike Mignola and others, it features a younger version of the fictional character Hellboy.

Publication history

Comics

Halloween Special
Hellboy Junior Halloween Special (October 15, 1997) featured a wrap-around cover by Bill Wray.

Mignola won the 1998 "Best Writer/Artist: Drama" Eisner Award in part for his work on this one-shot.

Issue 1
Hellboy Junior issue 1 (October 20, 1999) with a wrap-around cover  Bill Wray.

Issue 2
Hellboy Junior issue 2 (November 17, 1999) with cover by Hilary Barta.

Collected editions
Hellboy Junior trade paperback (January 21, 2004) collects all the material from Hellboy Junior Halloween Special, Hellboy Junior #1 and Hellboy Junior #2 plus original material.
Hellboy Jr. vs Hitler

References

Fantasy comics
1997 comics debuts
1999 comics debuts